Lise Bach Hansen (based in Copenhagen, Denmark) is head of the live literature program at The Royal Library, Denmark. She organizes and hosts literary conversations for the library’s public program series: International Authors' Stage. Since 2008 the program has turned The Royal Library into Copenhagen’s principal venue for live conversations, featuring international writers, intellectuals, politicians and artists. She is an advocate of cultural diplomacy, contributing to periodicals on economics and politics.

Early life and education 
Lise Bach Hansen was born in Jutland, Denmark. Her father, Søren Christian Hansen (1945–1993), was a playwright, novelist and documentalist. She is the mother of two daughters. Their father is the German composer Steingrimur Rohloff. Hansen has received a master's degree, a Mémoire de Diplome d’Etudes Aproffondie from the Ecole Doctorale at Université Paris X, Nanterre University and Université Paris III, La Sorbonne. Her memoir compared 17th-century French classical theatre with the works of the Danish playwright Ludvig Holberg (1684–1754) considered to be the founder of Danish and Norwegian literature. In 2000 she earned a master's degree in Communication from Roskilde University in Denmark.

The Royal Library 

In 2008, Hansen founded "International Forfatterscene", a conversation series with writers, intellectuals, artists and politicians. As head of the series and of a program for students, "Students Only!", Hansen has developed conversations with international personalities, including Alex Schulman, Kofi Annan, Dario Fo, Hillary Clinton, Salman Rushdie, Herta Müller, Siri Hustvedt, Bernard-Henri Lévy, Slavoj Žižek, Thomas Piketty, Günter Grass and Ban Ki-moon. She has worked in partnership with such organizations as Siemens, PEN, UN, Institut Français and The Goethe Institute.

Career 
Before founding The International Authors Stage at The Royal Library in Copenhagen, she was involved in communication and public relations within professional fields such as film, art, theatre and politics in both Paris and Copenhagen and she has held positions at The European Parliament in Brussels and the Danish art gallery, Kunstforeningen Gl. Strand in Copenhagen. Her interest in French language, politics and culture has influenced her career and she striven to present French artists, thinkers and writers to a Danish audience both through her writing and in her programming. She was behind an extensive initiative project for translating six of Ludvig Holberg¨s plays from Danish into modern French. The project was made in collaboration with La Maison Antoine Vitez in France and the translations were published by Editions Théâtrales in Paris.
On January 18, 2018, she received the French order Arts et Lettres at the French embassy in Copenhagen.

Throughout her professional life, she has undertaken cultural exchange projects in the Nordic Region. Nordic values on sustainability, cultural heritage, gender equality and climate protection have been priorities which resulted in the book and the transatlantic project Arctic Imagination. developed in cooperation with Paul Holdengräber

Publications 
In October 2019 her book, was published by Djøf Forlag. Her co-writer is Barbara Læssøe Stephensen. The book is about how to curate great live events and how to launch innovative artistic visions. Aimed at both students and professionals, it is based on her experience in the field, as well as on her research into international examples of best practice, while drawing on her theoretical background in dramaturgy, communication, rhetoric and literature.

References

External links 
 "Knowledge is pleasure", feature in Politiken
 "More than just a hotel", article in Information
 "Den politiske (film)scene", feature in Politiken
"Ludvig Holberg, hier et aujourd’hui", article in Théâtre Public
 "Holberg på fransk", feature in Politiken
 "Sæt Scenen", link to DJØF forlag's presentation of book
 International Authors' Stage

People from Copenhagen
Danish curators
Danish women writers
Living people
Year of birth missing (living people)